{{DISPLAYTITLE:C5H7N3O}}
C5H7N3O may refer to:

 Methylcytosine
 5-Methylcytosine
 1-Methylcytosine, a nucleic acid in Hachimoji DNA
 N(4)-Methylcytosine
 6-Methylcytosine
 Methylisocytosine
 1-Methylisocytosine
 3-Methylisocytosine
 4-Methylisocytosine
 5-Methylisocytosine
 6-Methylisocytosine (mecytosine)

See also 
 Cytosine
 Isocytosine
 Nucleic acid analogue